The year 1884 in archaeology involved some significant events.

Explorations
 Rev. William Collings Lukis and Sir Henry Dryden, Bart., survey megalithic monuments in Scotland, Cumberland and Westmoreland.

Excavations
 October - Augustus Pitt Rivers begins excavation of the Romano-British settlement site on Woodcutts Common, on his Cranborne Chase estate in Dorset.
 Tanis, Egypt: the first excavation conducted by Flinders Petrie.
 Excavations at the Oracle of Apollo on Ptoion are begun by the French School at Athens.

Finds
 Winter - First burials of the Remedello culture.
 Hittites' script identified on a monument at Boğazkale discovered by William Wright.

Institutions
 Pitt Rivers Museum established by donation of Augustus Pitt Rivers' anthropological and archaeological collections to the University of Oxford.
 Museum of Archaeology and Anthropology established at the University of Cambridge, opening as the Cambridge Antiquarian Library and Museum.

Publications
 François Lenormant -  (Paris).

Births
 January 26 - Roy Chapman Andrews, American explorer (d. 1960).
February 1 - Herbert Eustis Winlock, American Egyptologist who worked for the New York Metropolitan Museum of Art (d. 1950)
 July 25 - Davidson Black, Canadian paleoanthropologist (d. 1934)

References

Archaeology
Archaeology by year
Archaeology
Archaeology